Pape Rock is a lone rock at the south side of David Glacier, 3 nautical miles (6 km) northwest of Shomo Rock, in the Prince Albert Mountains, Oates Land. Mapped by United States Geological Survey (USGS) from surveys and U.S. Navy air photos, 1956–62. Named by Advisory Committee on Antarctic Names (US-ACAN) for Bernard C. Pape, builder with the South Pole Station winter party, 1966.

Rock formations of Oates Land